The National Food and Strategic Reserves Administration is a deputy cabinet-level national agency administered by the National Development and Reform Commission of the People's Republic of China.

References

Government agencies of China